Marcus Annius Verus Caesar (born 162 or 163 – 10 September 169) was a son of Roman Emperor Marcus Aurelius and Empress Faustina the Younger. Annius was made caesar on 12 October 166 AD, alongside his brother Commodus, designating them co-heirs of the Roman Empire. Annius died on 10 September 169, at age seven, due to complications from a surgery to remove a tumor from under his ear. His death left Commodus as the sole heir.

Life

Marcus Annius Verus was born in late 162 or 163 AD, the son of Marcus Aurelius and Faustina the Younger. He was given the name of Marcus Annius Verus because it was the original name of his father, Marcus Aurelius.

On 12 October 166 AD, during a triumph celebrating the victory of the Romans in the Parthian War of Lucius Verus, Annius and his elder brother Commodus were both made caesars, designating them as co-heirs to the Roman Empire. At the time, Annius was three, and Commodus was five. This was the first time such an explicit declaration of heirship had been made at such a young age, and showed a marked shift from the traditional cursus honorum, in which a presumed heir would be gradually raised through offices of increasing importance, in order to learn the skills of all positions, to a new system of imperial succession, wherein dynastic hereditary descent was the path to the throne, with heirs being instructed in how to be an emperor.

Annius died on 10 September 169 AD, at seven years of age, due to complications in removing a tumor from under his ear. This left Commodus as the sole heir. His father, Marcus Aurelius, mourned his death for just five days, while still continuing public work. Aurelius argued that because the games of Jupiter Optimus Maximus were ongoing, he should not interrupt them with his mourning. His lack of mourning was likely influenced by his Stoic philosophy, which taught of the dangers of emotion, and Roman cultural norms which treated hysterical grief at the loss of loved ones as unmanly and unnatural. Aurelius ordered  statues to be made in his honor, and a golden image of him to be carried during the procession of the games. Aurelius also had his name inserted into the Carmen Saliare, the ritual songs sung by the Salii, a group of 12 priests.

Family
Annius Verus was the son of Marcus Aurelius and Faustina the Younger. Annius was the younger brother of, in order of birth: Domitia Faustina, Titus Aurelius Antoninus, Titus Aelius Aurelius, Annia Aurelia Galeria Lucilla, Annia Galeria Aurelia Faustina, Titus Aelius Antoninus, an unnamed son, Annia Aurelia Fadilla, Annia Cornificia Faustina Minor, Titus Aurelius Fulvus Antoninus and Lucius Aurelius Commodus Antoninus (Commodus). Annius was the older brother of Hadrianus and Vibia Aurelia Sabina.

References

Bibliography

Websites

Further reading

160s births
169 deaths
Nerva–Antonine dynasty
Annii
2nd-century Romans
Caesars (heirs apparent)
Sons of Roman emperors
Heirs apparent who never acceded
Royalty who died as children
Deaths from surgical complications